Marte Meo (Latin "by own power") is a method of educational counselling.

It was developed in the late 1970s and early 1980s by the Dutch educational counsellor Maria Aarts. She recognised the difficulties in explaining scientific observations of a child's problems to parents and other educators, as they are often unable to relate to the pedagogic jargon and identify the relevance of these insights in everyday-life situations.

She developed a method where normal situations between child and educator were recorded by video and later watched by the parents or other educators to enable discussion together. By this, strengths and weaknesses of both children and educators in their interaction should be more easily recognised, which in turn aims at helping both to gain the optimism and power to solve educational issues themselves. Enhanced communication becomes the most important instrument in achieving this.

After having practiced Marte Meo for many years, Maria Aarts founded the Marte Meo organisation in 1987, which aimed at teaching educational counsellors how to apply the Marte Meo method.

Marte Meo has attracted significant attention not only in the Netherlands, but also in Scandinavia, France, Ireland and India where it is practiced. In these countries, it is often regarded as effective, cheap and pragmatic, which is opposite the viewpoint held by the therapeutic community in the United States, where the method is regarded as too time-consuming considering that there are other alternatives in such situations.

References

External links
Official website of the international Marte Meo organisation
Danish Marte Meo Centre
Swedish Marte Meo Association

Pedagogy
School counseling
Educational programs